Sinor may refer to:

 Sinor, Gujarat, a settlement in India
 Phasor, or sinor, a complex number in certain representations of periodic functions
 Denis Sinor (1916–2011), scholar in the history of Central Asia
 Jennifer Sinor, American writer

See also 
 Signor (disambiguation)
 Sinar (disambiguation)
 Siner (disambiguation)
 Sinur